The 2009 Malmö Davis Cup riots were anti-Israel riots in the Swedish city of Malmö against a Davis Cup tennis match between Sweden and Israel on 7 March 2009.

Background
In February, the tennis match was decided by Malmö's red-green city coalition to be closed to the public, a decision that was heavily criticised by the International Tennis Federation (ITF). The Mayor of Malmö, Ilmar Reepalu, personally said he thought the game should not be played at all, and the decision was thus considered to be more politically motivated than to do with security concerns.

Riots
In anticipation of protests, around 1,000 police officers sanctioned off a large area around the Baltic Hall tennis stadium to keep protesters and rioters away. A reported 170 truck loads of pavement stones were transported out of the area before the protests, and three schools were closed. In addition, for the first time in history, riot vehicles were brought in from Denmark.

The match was initially met with protest of around 6,000 to 7,000 anti-Israel demonstrators, with speeches held by the leader of the Left Party, Lars Ohly, who while wearing a Palestinian scarf was seen holding a map of Palestine with Israel eradicated. The demonstrators were joined by several hundred militants of which around 200 to 300 began attacking police with stones, fireworks and paint bombs. The anti-Israel rioters included AFA anti-fascists, militant Islamists, organised neo-Nazis, as well as activists from neighbouring countries. Police eventually detained around 100 rioters, arresting ten. An additional eighteen rioters were later identified and put on trial for their part in the riots, with several convictions.

Aftermath
The decision to close the tennis match to the public resulted in Malmö being banned from hosting tennis matches by the ITF for five years. In addition to having to provide $15,000 in minimum gate receipts for the match, the Swedish Tennis Association was fined an additional $25,000. The Swedish Tennis Association responded by issuing penalties to Malmö mayor Ilmar Reepalu for his involvement in the event.

The protest and riots led to accusations of antisemitism in Sweden.

Swedish history professor Kristian Gerner described the situation as "the worst crisis for Jews in Sweden since the Second World War."

A 2012 European Men's Handball Championship qualifier between Sweden and Israel set to be played in Karlskrona in June 2011 raised concerns due to the riots, and was considered for moving to another location by Swedish sports authorities. The match was played as scheduled, with a minor anti-Israel demonstration being held.

See also
 Båstad riots
 2008–09 Oslo riots
 2008 Malmo riots
 2010 & 2012 Malmö synagogue arson attacks

References

2009 Davis Cup
2009 in Sweden
2009 riots
2009 in tennis
Riots and civil disorder in Sweden
Sports riots
Political riots
2009 crimes in Sweden
Gaza War (2008–2009)
Anti-Zionism in Sweden
Islamism in Sweden
Neo-Nazism in Sweden
Left Party (Sweden)
Israel–Sweden relations
Politics and sports
March 2009 events in Europe
Protests in Sweden
Protests in the European Union
2000s in Malmö
Antisemitism in Sweden
2009 Davis Cup Europe/Africa Zone